Colonel Sadio Camara (born 1979) is a Malian military officer currently serving as Minister of Defence, who took active part in the 2020 Malian coup d'état along with Colonel Assimi Goïta that ousted the government of Ibrahim Boubacar Keïta.

He served as Minister of Defense between October 2020 and May 2021 when he was replaced. This prompted a new coup and he was reinstated as Minister of Defense on 11 June 2021, serving again in the charge since then.

Biography
Camara is a graduate of the Joint Military School. At the time of the 2020 coup he was serving as head of the Kati Military School, and was receiving military training in Russia. Camara took part in the August 2020 coup and was named Minister of Defense in October 2020 under the interim government of Prime Minister Moctar Ouane. He served in that position until late May 2021 when he was excluded from the newly formed government by Bah Ndaw, the interim leader after the 2020 coup.

His ousting allegedly prompted Colonel Assimi Goïta to launch a "coup within a coup" in May 2021 when Goïta took over power and ordered the arrest of Ndaw and his cabinet during the 2021 Malian coup d'état, which prompted the United Nations and many governments to condemn the coup and ask for the release of the detained leaders.

On 11 June 2021, Col. Goïta appointed Camara again as Minister of the Defense.

References 

1979 births
Living people
Malian military personnel
Defense ministers of Mali
People from Koulikoro Region
Colonels (military rank)
21st-century Malian politicians